Ahmad ibn Farighun (died 10th-century) was the first Farighunid ruler of Guzgan (9th-century–10th-century). He was the son of a certain Farighun.

He is the first Farighunid ruler fully attested in sources. During the campaigns of the Saffarid ruler Amr ibn al-Layth, Ahmad, along with another local Iranian ruler the Banijurid Abu Dawud Muhammad ibn Ahmad, was forced to the latter's authority. However, in 900, Amr was defeated and captured by the Samanid ruler Isma'il ibn Ahmad, which made Ahmad and Abu Dawud recognize Samanid authority. Ahmad was later succeeded by his son Abu'l Haret Muhammad at an unknown date.

Sources 
Bosworth, C. E. "ĀL-E FARĪḠŪN." Encyclopedia Iranica. 1 August 2012. <http://www.iranicaonline.org/articles/al-e-farigun-a-minor-iranian-dynasty-of-guzgan->
 

10th-century deaths
Year of birth unknown
9th-century Iranian people
10th-century Iranian people
Farighunids
10th-century monarchs in Asia
9th-century monarchs in Asia
Rulers of Guzgan